Des Clohessy (born 4 October 1973) is an Irish former rugby union player.

Career
Clohessy played for Young Munster in the All-Ireland League, where he made his name as a blindside flanker and number 8 and was a crucial player in the team that won the inaugural Munster Player Development League in 1996, before being encouraged to switch positions to prop and playing for Munster during their first ever season in the Heineken Cup. He was selected in the Ireland squad that toured South Africa in 1998, alongside older brother Peter, but did not win any international caps.

References

External links
Munster Profile
Eurosport Profile

Living people
1973 births
Rugby union players from County Limerick
Irish rugby union players
Munster Rugby players
Young Munster players
Rugby union props
Rugby union flankers
Rugby union number eights